Louise Cox may refer to:
 Louise Cox (painter) (1865–1945), American painter
 Louise Cox (architect) (born 1939), Australian architect